Edith Hillinger (born 1933) is a California artist who primarily creates watercolor paintings and mixed media collages.  She now lives and works in Berkeley, California.

She is the daughter of architect Franz Hillinger.

Personal life 
Hillinger was born in 1933 in Berlin, Germany. In 1937, her family fled to Turkey, where they lived in Istanbul and Ankara. In 1948, the family moved to New York, New York, where Hillinger eventually began her formal art education at Cooper Union School of Art. She obtained a four-year certificate in painting from Cooper Union and went on to New York University, graduating with a B.A. in 1976.

Art 
Though Hillinger draws inspiration from botanical and natural scenes, her career has seen her work tend more toward abstraction. Her work also takes inspiration from her formative experiences in different countries, implying "whole cultural histories through expression that is utterly personal." Her collage work has been noted to recall Picasso's graphic work, as well as the paintings of Paul Klee. This work can be seen as a synthesis of the influences of her youth, the adorned surfaces of Turkey and the minimal forms of the Bauhaus.

Feminism 
Hillinger has been documented as a founding member of the second wave women's movement, included in a directory of influential members who made notable changes to customs or laws in the US. She continues this work today toward the inclusion of female artists in the art historical canon. Hillinger founded the Bay Area Women Artists' Legacy Project to highlight women's contributions to Bay Area art.

References

External links 
 Artist's website
  Bay Area Women's Legacy Project

American watercolorists
20th-century American women artists
21st-century American women artists
1933 births
Living people
Women watercolorists